Myrtle Beach is a resort city on the east coast of the United States in Horry County, South Carolina. It is located in the center of a long and continuous  stretch of beach known as "The Grand Strand" in the northeastern part of the state. Its year-round population was 35,682 as of the 2020 census.

Myrtle Beach is one of the major centers of tourism in South Carolina and the United States. The city's warm subtropical climate, miles of beaches,  86 golf courses, and 1,800 restaurants attract over 20 million visitors each year, making Myrtle Beach one of the most visited destinations in the country.

Located along the historic King's Highway (modern U.S. Route 17), the region was once home to the Waccamaw people.  During the colonial period, the Whither family settled in the area, and a prominent local waterway, Wither's Swash, is named in their honor.  Originally called alternately "New Town" or "Withers", the area was targeted for development as a resort community by Franklin Burroughs, whose sons completed a railroad to the beach and the first inn, Seaside Inn.  His widow named the new community Myrtle Beach after the local wax-myrtle shrubs.

The Myrtle Beach metropolitan area is the one of fastest-growing metropolitan areas in the country, with a population of 551,126 as of the 2020 census. More than 104,000 people moved to the area over eight years, representing a nearly 28% growth in population.

History

Prior to the arrival of Europeans, the Long Bay area was inhabited by the historic  Waccamaw tribe. The Waccamaw used the river for travel and fished along the shore around Little River. Waties Island, the primary barrier island along Long Bay, has evidence of burial and shell mounds, remains of the visiting Waccamaw.

The first European settlers along Long Bay arrived in the late 18th century, attempting to extend the plantation system outward toward the ocean. Records are sparse from this period, with most of the recorded history pieced together from English colonial land grant documents. These settlers gained mixed results, producing unremarkable quantities of indigo and tobacco, the two major commodity crops. The coast's soil was sandy and most of the crop yields were of inferior quality.

Prior to the American Revolution, the area along the future Grand Strand was essentially uninhabited. Several families received land grants along the coast, including the Witherses: John, Richard, William, and Mary. This family received an area around present-day Wither's Swash, also known as Myrtle Swash or the Eight-Mile Swash. A separate grant was granted to James Minor, including a barrier island named Minor Island, now Waties Island, off the coast near Little River.

Mary Withers's gravestone at Prince George Winyah Parish Church speaks to the remoteness of the former Strand: "She gave up the pleasures of Society and retired to Long Bay, where she resided a great part of her life devoted to the welfare of her children."

As the American colonies gained independence, the area remained essentially unchanged, and the coast remained barren. George Washington scouted out the Southern states during his term, traveling down the King's Highway. He stayed a night at Windy Hill (part of present-day North Myrtle Beach) and was led across Wither's Swash to Georgetown by Jeremiah Vereen.

The Withers family remained one of the few settlers around Myrtle Beach for the next half-century. In 1822, a strong hurricane swept the house of R. F. Withers into the ocean, drowning 18 people inside. The tragedy made the Withers family decide to abandon their plots along the coast. Left unattended, the area began to return to forest.

The Burroughs and Collins Company of Conway, predecessor of modern-day Burroughs & Chapin, purchased much of the Withers family's land in 1881. The growing community was called "New Town" around the start of the 20th century. A post office named "Withers" was established to serve the site of the old Swash in 1888. On 28 February 1899, Burroughs and Collins received a charter to build the Conway & Seashore Railroad to transport timber from the coast to inland customers. The railroad began daily service on 1 May 1900, with two wood-burning locomotives. One of the engines was dubbed The Black Maria and came second-hand from a North Carolina logging operation.

After the railroad was finished, employees of the lumber and railroad company would take train flatcars down to the beach area on their free weekends, becoming the first Grand Strand tourists. The railroad terminus was nicknamed "New Town", contrasting it with the "Old Town", or Conway.

Around the start of the 20th century, Franklin Burroughs envisioned turning New Town into a tourist destination rivaling the Florida and northeastern beaches. Burroughs died in 1897, but his sons completed the railroad's expansion to the beach and opened the Seaside Inn in 1901.

Around 1900, a contest was held to name the area, and Burroughs's wife suggested honoring the locally abundant shrub, the southern wax myrtle (Myrica cerifera). The Withers post office changed its name to "Myrtle Beach" soon afterward. It incorporated as a town in 1938 and as a city in 1957.

In 1937, Myrtle Beach Municipal Airport was built. It was taken over by the United States Army Air Corps in 1940 and converted into a military base. Commercial flights began in 1976 and shared the runway for over 15 years until the air base closed in 1993. Since then the airport has been named Myrtle Beach International Airport. In 2010 plans to build a new terminal were approved. In 1940, Kings Highway was finally paved, giving Myrtle Beach its first primary highway.

The Myrtle Heights-Oak Park Historic District, Myrtle Beach Atlantic Coast Line Railroad Station, Ocean Forest Country Club and Pleasant Inn are listed on the National Register of Historic Places. Also listed were the Chesterfield Inn, Rainbow Court and the Myrtle Beach Pavilion, all now demolished. The Gay Dolphin Gift Cove on the Boardwalk was built in 1946 and sells seashells and Myrtle Beach souvenirs. It claims to be the "nation's largest gift shop".

Geography

Myrtle Beach has been separated from the continental United States since 1936 by the Intracoastal Waterway, forcing the city and area in general to develop within a small distance from the coast. In part due to this separation, the area directly northwest of Myrtle Beach, across the waterway, remained primarily rural for a while, whereas its northeastern and southwestern ends were bordered by other developed tourist towns, North Myrtle Beach and Surfside Beach. Since then, the inland portion of the Myrtle Beach area has developed dramatically.

Neighborhoods

Arcadian Shores
Benton Park
Booker T. Washington
Carrie May Johnson
Carver
Chestnut Hill
Dogwood
Dunes Cove
East Chester
Fantasy Harbour
Forest Acres
Forest Dunes
Futrell Park
Grande Dunes
Green Bay Park
Harlem
Highlands
Hurl Rocks
Konig
Market Common
Myrtlewood
Myrtle Heights
Northwood
Ocean Forest
Ocean View
Old Pine Lakes
Owens
Pebble Beach
Pine Lake Estates
Pine Lakes
Plantation Point
Racepath
Ramsey Acres
Seagate Village
Springmaid Beach
The Dunes
Washington Park
Withers Preserve
Withers Swash
Yaupon Circle

Suburbs

Carolina Forest
Forestbrook
Garden City
Garden City Beach
Murrells Inlet
Socastee
Surfside Beach
Atlantic Beach
Red Hill
Loris
Aynor
Pawley's Island
Cherry Grove
Longs
Little River
Race Path

Climate
According to the Köppen climate classification, Myrtle Beach has a humid subtropical climate or Cfa – typical of the Gulf and South Atlantic states. The city enjoys abundant sunshine year-round with more than 2800 hours annually.

The summer season is long, hot, and humid in Myrtle Beach. The Bermuda High pumps in humidity from the tropical Atlantic toward Myrtle Beach, giving summers a near-tropical feel in the city. The warm Atlantic Ocean reaches  or higher in the summer months off Myrtle Beach, making for warm and sultry summer nights. Summer thunderstorms are common in the hot season in Myrtle Beach, and the summer months from June through September have the most precipitation. In summer, thunderstorms normally build during the heat of the day – followed by brief and intense downpours. On average, September is the wettest month, with August close behind, due to the combination of thunderstorms and tropical weather systems that peaks these months.

Winter temperatures vary more than summer temperatures in Myrtle Beach: Some winters can see several cold days with highs only in the upper 40s F (7–9 °C), while other winter days can see highs in the upper 60s and low 70s F (19–23 °C). Myrtle Beach averages 33 days annually with frost, though in some years less than 15 days will see frost. Snowfall is very rare in Myrtle Beach; however, at least a trace of snow falls a few times each decade. In February 2010, a rare  of snow fell in Myrtle Beach. The spring (March, April and May) and fall (September, October and November) months are normally mild and sunny in Myrtle Beach, with high temperatures in the 60s and 70s. The beach season in Myrtle Beach normally runs from late April through late October. SST (Sea Surface Temperatures) are often in the lower 80's (26–28 °C) off South Carolina in summer and early fall.

In spite of the mild winter averages, ice days have been recorded, albeit rarely.

Summer thunderstorms are typically brief, but severe thunderstorms do occur on occasion. Tornadoes are rare, with the most significant event occurring in 2001 when multiple tornadoes touched down in the area. Tropical cyclones occasionally impact Myrtle Beach, though weaker tropical storms and weak tropical lows are more common. Like most areas prone to tropical cyclones, a direct hit by a major hurricane is infrequent in Myrtle Beach. The last hurricane to cause significant damage in Myrtle Beach was Hurricane Hugo in 1989. The worst hurricane in Myrtle Beach's history was Hurricane Hazel in 1954.

Demographics

Myrtle Beach is the largest principal city of the Myrtle Beach-Conway-Georgetown CSA, a Combined Statistical Area that includes the Myrtle Beach-Conway-North Myrtle Beach metropolitan area (Horry County) and the Georgetown micropolitan area (Georgetown County), which had a combined population of 329,449 at the 2010 census.

2020 census

As of the 2020 United States census, there were 35,682 people, 13,817 households, and 7,678 families residing in the city.

2010 census
As of the 2010 census, the population of Myrtle Beach was 27,109. According to the 2000 census there were 22,759 permanent residents in Myrtle Beach, 10,413 households, 5,414 families, 1,356.5 people per square mile (523.7/km2), with 14,658 housing units at an average density of 873.5 per square mile (337.3/km2).

Ethnicities
The city's racial makeup was:
72.3% White
13.9% Black
0.7% Native American
1.5% Asian
0.3% Pacific Islander
8.7% from other races
2.7% from two or more races.
Hispanic or Latino of any race were 13.7% of the population.

Age

Of the total Myrtle Beach population:
18.0% were 1–17
11.0% were between 18 and 24
33.6% were between 25 and 44
22.5% were between 45 and 64
15.0% were 65 or older
Median age was 37 years
103 males per 100 females overall
101 males per 100 females age 18 and over

Income
Overall median income for a household in the city was $50,173
Median income for a family was $43,900
Males had a median income of $26,039
Females had a median income of $22,473
The per capita income for the city was $23,214.
About 7.6% of families and 12.0% of the population were below the poverty line, including 17.1% of those under age 18 and 6.6% of those age 65 or over.

Crime rate
Crime rate levels in Myrtle Beach are high compared to the rest of South Carolina. The FBI reported 583 cases of violent crime in the year 2016, of which 5 were murder, 46 were rape and 139 were robbery. Aggravated assault 348, property crime 4395, burglary 469, larceny theft 3555, motor vehicle theft 371, and arson 10 were also reported.

The average number of crimes per thousand population is 0.16 murders, 1.43 rapes, 4.31 robberies and 10.83 assaults.

The FBI reported 483 violent crimes in 2000, of which 1 was murder and 39 were rapes.

Economy
Myrtle Beach's economy is dominated by the tourist industry; hotels, motels, resorts, restaurants, attractions, and retail developments exist in abundance to serve visitors.

Tourism

Hosting over 20 million visitors annually, the Grand Strand is home to an array of tourist attractions, and the area receives a large influx of visitors during all seasons. It is estimated that nearly 100,000 visitors a year are international travelers, including tourists from Canada, Germany and the United Kingdom.

Myrtle Beach hosts a variety of special conventions, events, and musical concerts. The area's attractions include its beaches and courses, amusement parks, an aquarium, Legends in Concert, retail developments, shopping complexes and over 1,900 restaurants including seafood restaurants. The area also has dinner theaters, nightclubs, and many tourist shops. Myrtle Beach has approximately 425 hotels, with many on the beachfront, and approximately 157 accommodation units in total. The area is also home to over 80 golf courses and over 30 miniature golf courses. Live shows are offered year round at theaters including the Alabama Theatre, Carolina Opry, Asher Theater, Calvin Gilmore Theater, Legends in Concert, and Medieval Times Family Dinner Theater.  Several shows offer special holiday themed shows.

The Myrtle Beach Boardwalk opened in 2010 and has been recognized as the nation's #3 boardwalk by National Geographic and one of the best US boardwalks by Travel + Leisure magazine. The Myrtle Beach Skywheel opened at the boardwalk in May 2011, and is a  observation wheel, similar to a ferris wheel, with glass gondolas that look over the Atlantic Ocean. This is the first wheel of its kind in the U.S. Myrtle Beach State Park, established in 1935, has just under a mile of Grand Strand beach and is a prime location for camping, swimming, hiking, biking, and fishing. Pier 14 by the Boardwalk.

The Myrtle Beach Convention Center is a large facility that hosts a variety of meetings, conferences, exhibits, and special events every year. The expansive center, which opened in 2003, has a Sheraton hotel and resort.

Annual Events 
Each March since 1951 during Ontario's spring break, Myrtle Beach has hosted Canadian-American Days, also known as Can-Am Days. Tens of thousands of tourists flock to the area for a week's worth of special events. Myrtle Beach is also home to Coastal Uncorked, a food and wine festival held in the late spring annually. The city hosts Sun Fun Festival early each June.  Later in June, Myrtle Beach is a popular destination for recently graduated high school seniors for Senior Week.

Carolina Country Music Fest (CCMF) is an outdoor country music festival that takes place in June of each year and was founded in 2015 by Charlotte-based company Full House Productions. Due to concerns surrounding the coronavirus pandemic the festival wasn't held in 2020, but is scheduled to return in 2021 and take place on 10–13 June 2021.

Myrtle Beach International Airport serves the city and surrounding area. With regular flights to and from destinations such as Atlanta, Boston, Detroit, Fort Lauderdale, New York and Washington, the airport is well connected for both domestic and international tourists. It also serves as a seasonal gateway to and from the likes of Chicago, Dallas and Toronto.

The city is between Wilmington, North Carolina and Charleston, South Carolina with U.S. Route 17 serving as the main transport link for those journeying between those cities.

Thong bikini ban
Thongs (or any swimwear revealing any portion of the buttocks) are not permitted in public in Myrtle Beach, including all beaches. Violators of the ban may be arrested, jailed, or fined. The city's "thong ordinance" has been in effect since the 1990s.

Motorcycle rallies

Myrtle Beach Bike Week, also called "Harley Bike Week", is a week-long motorcycle rally first held in 1940, the same year Kings Highway was paved. The event has attracted as many as 200,000 visitors to the city every May. Black Bike Week, founded in 1980, takes place the weekend around Memorial Day Weekend and is the largest African American motorcycle rally in the US and attracts as many as 400,000 visitors. The event was created in response to a history of discrimination against African-American visitors and riders to Myrtle Beach and the Grand Strand Area.

The Myrtle Beach government created 15 new laws aimed at preventing all sanctioned motorcycle events within the city in response to controversy including accusations of racism by African-American riders during their event and complaints of lawlessness and poor behavior during all highly attended events. Several lawsuits by the National Association for the Advancement of Colored People (NAACP) against Myrtle Beach businesses were settled with agreements that discrimination cease, compensation be given to some plaintiffs, and employees be given diversity training. The NAACP suit against the City of Myrtle Beach was settled in 2006 without the city paying damages, but with the agreement police would use the same traffic control rules during both the black and the white motorcycle rallies.

The South Carolina Supreme Court in June 2010 unanimously overturned one of the 15 ordinances, which had required all motorcyclists to wear helmets, on the grounds that the state law, requiring helmets only for riders under age 21, cannot be preempted by a city ordinance. In addition, the Court ruled that the ordinance created undue confusion, and that the city itself had invalidated their own helmet law and some other ordinances in a subsequent amendment. The law had been challenged by a group of motorcyclists and a group of Myrtle Beach businesses called BOOST, Business Owners Organized to Support Tourism, who opposed the city's anti-motorcycle tourism policy.

Shopping

Major shopping malls in Myrtle Beach include:
Coastal Grand Mall opened in 2004 and is the second largest indoor malls in the state. The single-story facility has five anchor stores (including Sears, Belk, JCPenney, and Dillard's), a 14-screen movie theater, a food court, and roughly 170 stores in total.
The single-story mall also has a 12-screen movie theater, a food court, and other specialty stores. It used to be known as Colonial Mall, and was built as Briarcliffe Mall.
Tanger Outlets is a shopping outlet center. There are two locations, one near Briarcliffe Acres and one near Carolina Forest.
Broadway at the Beach is a shopping complex set on  along the U.S. 17 Bypass surrounding the  Lake Broadway. It is the largest festival entertainment complex in South Carolina.
Barefoot Landing is an outdoor shopping complex that consists of several divided sections on filled land over top of Louis Lake, next to the Intracoastal Waterway. It contains many stores and attractions such as House of Blues (opened in 1997) and the Alabama Theatre. Opened in 1988.
The Market Common is a lifestyle district housing several upscale retail and apartments. It is on the site of the former Myrtle Beach Air Force Base.

Sports

Golf
The area is home to numerous golf courses and mini-golf courses along the Grand Strand and further inland. Myrtle Beach has been called the "Golf Capital of the World" because of the roughly 100 golf courses there, the record 4.2 million rounds played, and many miniature golf courses. 3.2 million total rounds of golf were played in 2017, down a "few hundred rounds" from a decade earlier. The number of golf courses more than doubled to over 120 over a 20-year period before declining late in the first decade of the 21st century. Tiger Woods declared Myrtle Beach "the mecca of golf" when visiting in 1997. The majority of the area's golf courses are public. The Grand Strand is home of "Hootie and the Blowfish Day After the Masters Tournament". Extensive Chinese investment to the Myrtle Beach area golf market has resulted in a significant surge of Chinese tourists to the area and also resulted in 25+ golf courses being owned and/or operated by Chinese nationals.

Some of the notable golf courses and/or resorts include Barefoot Resort & Golf and TPC of Myrtle Beach.

Long-distance running events
From 1998 to 2009 and again starting in 2011 (no Saturday races were held in 2010 due to snow), the area hosted the Bi-Lo Myrtle Beach Marathon presented by Chick-Fil-A, every February featuring (since 2004) the Friday night Royal Bank of Canada 5K and the Saturday Dasani Half Marathon and Bi-Lo Marathon (from 1998 until 2008, a relay was held but dropped because of the popularity of the other events). Marathon day draws the limit of 6,000 runners annually (2,500 full, 3,500 half) and results usually in an unusual dawn as the race starts before dawn (6:30 am) in order to finish by 2:30 pm.

Athletic teams and facilities
Myrtle Beach is home to the Myrtle Beach Pelicans, a Carolina League baseball team and a Chicago Cubs farm franchise. It was also home to the Myrtle Beach Mutiny, a pro soccer team playing in the Premier Development League until 2018.
TicketReturn.com Field at Pelicans Ballpark is the home field of the Myrtle Beach Pelicans and is just off Highway 17 in Myrtle Beach. It opened in 1999 and seats 6,500 people. It is the finish point of the Bi-Lo Myrtle Beach Marathon. TicketReturn.com Field is also home of the annual "Baseball at the Beach" collegiate baseball tournament. Hosted by Coastal Carolina University each year, the tournament pits participating NCAA Division I baseball programs in the United States.

NASCAR
Drivers in the Late Model classes will compete (against those of Greenville-Pickens Speedway) for the South Carolina Championship in the NASCAR Whelen All-American Series. South Carolina Champions' scores will be calculated against other state and provincial champions for a continental championship.

It hosted the 2010 UOA Nationals where 8 collegiate ultimate teams from 5 conferences will be represented.

Government
The city of Myrtle Beach has a council-manager government. The Mayor sits as a Council member-at-large and presides over City council meetings. If the Mayor cannot preside over a City Council meeting, the Mayor Pro-Tem is the presiding officer of the meeting until such time as the Mayor returns to the seat. The City Manager is responsible for the administration and the day-to-day operation of all of the municipal services and city departments. The City Manager also maintains intergovernmental relationships with federal, state, county and other local governments. The city of Myrtle Beach reformed into a council-manager government system in 1974 under the administration of Mayor Bob Hirsch and city manager David Stradinger, who moved away from the city's former strong-mayor form of government.

Mayors
Brenda Bethune is the mayor of Myrtle Beach. She has served since 2018.

Education

Primary and secondary education

Public schools
Myrtle Beach is served by a single public school district. Horry County Schools educates around 40,000 students and is the third largest school district in South Carolina.

Private schools and Charter schools
Below is a list of private schools and charter schools within or near the city of Myrtle Beach.

Bridgewater Academy (K-8)
Coastal Leadership Academy (9-12)
Calvary Christian School (PK-12)
Chabad Academy (PK-7)
Christian Academy of Myrtle Beach (K-12)
Holy Trinity Catholic School (PK-5)
Myrtle Beach Seventh-Day Adventist Christian School (K-8)
North Myrtle Beach Christian School (PK-12)
Risen Christ Christian Academy (PK-12)
St. Andrew Catholic School (K-8)
St. Elizabeth Ann Seton Catholic High School (6-12)
St. Michael Catholic School (K-8)
Valorous Academy (PK-12)

Higher education
Myrtle Beach has the following college and post-secondary schools:

Golf Academy of America
Palmetto School of Career Development – Myrtle Beach Campus
Horry-Georgetown Technical College - Myrtle Beach Campus (main campus in Conway)
Webster University – Myrtle Beach Campus

Media

Television
The Grand Strand and Florence, South Carolina, share a common defined market by Nielsen Media Research in Horry, Marion, Dillon, Darlington, Marlboro, Scotland, Robeson, and Florence counties. Two major stations are licensed to Myrtle Beach: NBC affiliate WMBF-TV 32 and Fox affiliate WFXB 43. Myrtle Beach is also served by PBS member stations WHMC/WJPM-TV 23/33, licensed respectively to Conway and Florence, and three commercial stations licensed to Florence: CBS affiliate WBTW 13 (with MyNetworkTV on DT2), ABC affiliate WPDE-TV 15, and CW affiliate WWMB 21.

Radio

Newspapers
The Sun News has traditionally been the largest daily paper published along the Grand Strand, with a readership base extending from Georgetown, South Carolina, to Sunset Beach, North Carolina. The paper has been in existence since the 1930s and was formerly published by Knight Ridder before that company was bought by The McClatchy Company. Like many newspapers, the paper has declined in recent years due to shifts in readership and financial pressures at its parent company. It stopped local printing operations and downsized its newsroom in May 2020.

Myrtle Beach is also served by The Myrtle Beach Herald, a weekly newspaper that is part of the Waccamaw Publishers group. It is locally owned by Steve and Cheryl Robertson. The Herald also produces a newspaper targeted at tourists called  Visit!.

In 2020, Charleston-based The Post and Courier set up an official bureau in Myrtle Beach, after years of attempting to move into the market and purchasing The Georgetown Times, which it merged with the new operation.

Infrastructure

Healthcare
Grand Strand Medical Center (GSMC) is a 369-bed acute care hospital and Level 1 Adult Trauma Center known for its programs in cardiology, heart surgery, and stroke treatment. It was opened on 21 April 1978 to succeed the former Ocean View Memorial Hospital (1958-1978), the first major hospital in Myrtle Beach. GSMC contains the only cardiac surgery and neurosurgery programs in the greater Myrtle Beach area and was a recipient of the Healthgrades 100 Best Hospitals for Cardiac Surgery in 2012 and 2013. As a teaching hospital, Grand Strand Medical Center is the home of ACGME accredited residency training programs (internal medicine, general surgery, emergency medicine, and family medicine), and hosts rotating medical students from the University of South Carolina and Edward Via College of Osteopathic Medicine (VCOM). Over 270 physicians and 1,400 staff serve at the facility.

Transportation

Air

The Myrtle Beach International Airport (IATA: MYR/FAA LID: MYR), is a county-owned public-use airport three nautical miles (5.6 km) southwest of the central business district of Myrtle Beach, in Horry County, South Carolina, United States. (MYR) It was formerly known as Myrtle Beach Jetport (1974–1989) and is on site of the former Myrtle Beach Air Force Base.
The General Aviation Terminal www.beachaviationservices.com (ICAO: KMYR/FAA LID:MYR), is a part of the Myrtle Beach International Airport however, the terminal is on the opposite side of the airfield from the commercial terminal side of the airport on Airdrome Street accessed by Phyllis Boulevard inside The Market Common. This new 11,500 square foot terminal was opened on 21 May 2010, built to modernize operations and accommodate the growing needs of the terminal. The new terminal replaces a building that was previously used as Base Operations when the Myrtle Beach Air Force Base was active.
Executive Helicopters is within the Myrtle Beach International Airport as well. It is on the eastern side of the airport with access from Kings Highway. Executive Helicopters is a private helicopter facility that provides tour services in the Myrtle Beach and surrounding areas. They also provide the majority of maintenance for General Aviation. In addition; Myrtle Air Service a division of Kingman Aircraft Kingman, AZ operate a maintenance facility on site providing maintenance for mid-sized jets. Military operations are also ongoing supporting USMC, USN, USAF, US Army and Coast Guard.

Rail
The Waccamaw Coast Line Railroad is a  short-line railroad division of the Baltimore and Annapolis Railroad, extending from a connection with the Carolina Southern Railroad, another division of that company, at Conway to Myrtle Beach. The line was opened in 1900 by the Conway Coast and Western Railroad, a predecessor of the Atlantic Coast Line Railroad. The Seaboard System Railroad sold the line to Horry County in November 1985, and it was operated by the Horry County Railway until October 1987, when the WCLR took over. The Carolina Southern Railroad acquired the WCLR in September 1995, and since then it has been a division of the Baltimore and Annapolis Railroad. Horry County owns the line but leased it to the Carolina Southern Railroad in 2000.

It transports mostly freight brought to it from national rail operators. The company makes one scheduled delivery per month into the City of Myrtle Beach. It is off of Main Street in Conway, South Carolina, and is one of the few remaining train depots in South Carolina. It has been painstakingly restored to its former glory and the Carolina Southern Railroad has become one of the frequent destinations for freight services as well as passenger cars and observational locomotives. The railroad was originally erected in late 1886 and the first train steamed into the Conway Depot in December 1887.

The Carolina Southern Railroad stands as a permanent landmark in Southern History. Carolina Southern Railroad is a member of the Carolina Rails system with connections that run from Whiteville, North Carolina, to Mullins, South Carolina, and also from Chadbourn, North Carolina, to Conway. Carolina Southern railroad is also responsible for operation of the Waccamaw Coast Line Railroad, which is a railway that runs from Conway to Myrtle Beach.

On August 30, 2011, Carolina Southern Railroad voluntary shut down because several bridges along the rail were overdue for maintenance. The shutdown caused Carolina Southern Railroad to lay off nearly all of its employees. On May 24, 2012, the Federal Railroad Administration (FRA) commenced a bridge inspection on the CSR and the Waccamaw Coastline Railroad (the Horry County portion of rail). Fifty-two of 187 bridges were inspected and seven had critical defects. On May 26, 2011, the CSR voluntarily ceased operation, so that they could bring in a certified bridge engineer to inspect the seven critical bridges and prepare a plan for their repairs. Based on the engineer's recommendations, CSR made the necessary repairs on the bridges and CSR resumed operations August 8, 2011. The FRA returned to inspect the bridges and made a recommendation that CSR cease operations until all bridge repairs were completed. There are efforts to bring the railroad back online.

In 2015, railroad operator RJ Corman acquired the former CSR line and re-opened it freight service in early April 2016.

Until 1955 the Atlantic Coast Line Railroad ran passenger rail service from the Myrtle Beach Station to Chadbourn, where a connection could be made to interstate ACL train service.

Roads

Farrow Parkway
Ocean Boulevard
Harrelson Boulevard
Grissom Parkway

Within the last decade, new roads have been created to ease congestion caused by the yearly influx of visitors. Most of these roads follow the Metro Loop Road Plan, organized in 1997 to improve the traffic flow of Myrtle Beach. Some of the roads included have either been funded through Road Improvement Development Effort (RIDE I) funding or through the City of Myrtle Beach.

RIDE II plans include the third phase of S.C. Highway 31, a graded separation of Farrow Parkway and US 17 Bypass at the back gate of the former Air Force base, and many other projects. The county is debating where to allocate the $400 million generated through a proposed 1-cent sales tax. Other road projects in Horry County, including some in Aynor and Conway, will be included when voted upon.

Plans exist for Myrtle Beach to be served by two interstates, Interstate 73 and Interstate 74. The Robert Edge Parkway will connect I-74 to downtown North Myrtle Beach.

Mass transit
Myrtle Beach is served by the Coast RTA and the Pee Dee Regional Transportation Authority.

Notable people
Sigmund Abeles – American figurative artist
 Steve Bailey – bassist
 Madison Iseman – actress
 Robert H. Brooks – founder of Naturally Fresh, Inc. and Hooters of America chains
 Dusty Button – ballet dancer
 Shane Carruth – filmmaker
 Brandon Frye – former NFL player, drafted by the Houston Texans
 Everett Golson – Active CFL quarterback and starting quarterback for Notre Dame team that played in the 2013 BCS National Championship Game
 Anthony James – Character actor in films and television
 Dustin Johnson – PGA Tour player (attended Coastal Carolina University)
 Ewa Laurance – professional billiards player
 Clint Newton – rugby league player for the Penrith Panthers
 Nancy O'Dell – Television Personality
 Hunter Renfrow – NFL wide receiver and return specialist for the Las Vegas Raiders
 Brian Rutenberg – American painter
 Ramon Sessions – NBA player for the Washington Wizards
 Kelly Wearstler – interior designer; judge on Bravo's Top Design

Sister cities

 Burlington, Ontario, Canada
 Keighley, West Yorkshire, United Kingdom
 Pinamar, Argentina
 Killarney, County Kerry, Ireland
 Tiberias, Israel

See also 
 List of municipalities in South Carolina

References

External links

 
 
 

 
Cities in South Carolina
Myrtle Beach metropolitan area
Seaside resorts in the United States
Populated coastal places in South Carolina
Cities in Horry County, South Carolina
Beaches of South Carolina